Julia Driver is professor of philosophy and holder of the Darrell K. Royal Chair in Ethics and American Society at the University of Texas, Austin.  She is a specialist in moral philosophy
.

Education and career

She received her Ph.D. in philosophy at Johns Hopkins University in 1990 under the supervision of Susan R. Wolf.  She received her BA from the University of Texas at Austin in 1983.

Before moving to Texas in 2019, she taught at Washington University in St. Louis, Dartmouth College, Virginia Tech, and Brooklyn College of the City University of New York..

She and her husband philosopher Roy Sorensen are also professorial fellows at University of St Andrews.

She has received a Laurance S. Rockefeller Fellowship from Princeton University, NEH Fellowship, and an HLA Hart Fellowship at Oxford University. She is presently co-editor of the journal Ethics.

Philosophical work

She is the author of Uneasy Virtue, Consequentialism, and Ethics: The Fundamentals, as well as many articles in ethics and moral psychology. She is the leading proponent of a consequentialist approach to virtue theory.  

In 2015, her book Consequentialism was translated by Iranian philosopher Shirzad Peik Herfeh into Persian.

See also
Consequentialism
Shirzad Peik Herfeh
 List of American philosophers

References

External links
 Washington University bio

Year of birth missing (living people)
Living people
21st-century American philosophers
Washington University in St. Louis faculty
Johns Hopkins University alumni
University of Texas at Austin alumni
Brooklyn College faculty
Virginia Tech faculty
Dartmouth College faculty